DHX may refer to:

 ICAO designator for DHL International Aviation ME, a Bahraini cargo airline, subsidiary of DHL Express.
 DHX Media, a former name of the canadian media production, distribution and broadcasting company WildBrain.

Disambiguation pages